The 2009 New Zealand Warriors season was the 15th in the club's history. They competed in the NRL's 2009 Telstra Premiership and finished 14th (out of 16). The coach of the Warriors was Ivan Cleary while Steve Price was the team's captain. In 2009 Warriors games were broadcast on New Zealand's Sky network averaged 107,163 viewers.

Milestones
14 March – Round One: Steve Price played in his 300th National Rugby League game.
14 March – Round One: Four players made their debuts for the Warriors; Denan Kemp, Joel Moon, Jacob Lillyman & Leeson Ah Mau. Ah Mau also made his first grade debut.
22 March – Round Two: Two players made their debuts for the Warriors; Jesse Royal & Ukuma Ta'ai. Ta'ai also made his first grade debut.
5 April – Round Four: Game dedicated to the memory of Sonny Fai, the Warriors lose to the South Sydney Rabbitohs 22–16.
5 April – Round Four: Nathan Fien played in his 100th game for the Warriors.
5 April – Round Four: Daniel O'Regan made his first grade debut, becoming Warrior #150.
3 May – Round Eight: Lewis Brown made his first grade debut.
17 May – Round Ten: Jerome Ropati played in his 100th National Rugby League game and 100th game for the club.
31 May – Round Twelve: Two players made their first grade debuts; Kevin Locke and Aaron Heremaia.
12 June – Round Fourteen: Stacey Jones played in his 250th game for the club.
19 July – Round Nineteen: Isaac John made his first grade debut.
26 July – Round Twenty: Patrick Ah Van played in his 50th National Rugby League game and 50th game for the club.
31 July – Round Twenty One: Evarn Tuimavave played in his 100th National Rugby League game and 100th game for the club. It was also Tuimavave's first game of the season.
15 August – Round Twenty Three: Siuatonga Likiliki made his first grade debut.
5 September – Round Twenty Six: Simon Mannering played in his 100th National Rugby League game and 100th game for the club.
5 September – Round Twenty Six: Stacey Jones played in his last game for the club, the Warriors lost to the Melbourne Storm 30–0.

Jersey and sponsors

Fixtures 

The Warriors used Mt Smart Stadium as their home ground in 2009, their only home ground since they entered the competition in 1995.

Trial Matches

Regular season

Ladder

Squad 

The Warriors used Twenty Nine players in 2009. Twelve players made their debut for the club, including eight making their National Rugby League debuts.

Staff
Chief Executive Officer: Wayne Scurrah

NRL Staff
NRL Head Coach: Ivan Cleary
NRL Assistant Coach: John Ackland
NRL Head Trainer: Craig Walker
NRL Assistant Trainer: Dayne Norton
NRL Football Manager: Don Mann Jr
NRL Physiotherapist: Jude Spiers
Club Doctor: John Mayhew

NYC Staff
NYC Head Coach: Tony Iro
NYC Assistant Coach: Frank Harold
NYC Team Manager: Dean Bell

Transfers

Gains

Losses

Mid-Season Losses

Contract extensions
Simon Mannering (until 2012)
Jerome Ropati (until 2012)
Lance Hohaia (until 2011, with option)
Patrick Ah Van (until 2011)
Aaron Heremaia (until 2011, with option)
Isaac John (until 2011, with option)
Ian Henderson (until 2011)
Ivan Cleary (until 2012)

Sonny Fai
Warrior Sonny Fai went missing at around 7pm on 4 January 2009, after being caught in a rip current while trying to save some family who had got into difficulty at Te Henga (Bethells Beach), Auckland. His body is yet to be found. The entire team attended his two memorial services, one in a Samoan Methodist Church and one held at Te Henga (Bethells Beach).

The Warriors wore black armbands for their opening NRL match of the 2009 season, as well as jerseys embroidered with Fai's signature and official team number in honour of him.

End of Season awards
Lion Red Player of the Year: Micheal Luck
Canterbury of New Zealand Clubman of the Year: Sam Rapira
Vodafone NRL Young Player of the Year: Russell Packer
Vodafone One Tribe Supporters' Player of the Year: Kevin Locke
Sonny Fai Medal: Elijah Taylor

Other Teams
In 2009 the Junior Warriors again competed in the Toyota Cup while senior players who were not required for the first team played with the Auckland Vulcans in the NSW Cup. The Auckland Vulcans were coached by Bernie Perenara and finished 11th out of eleven teams.

Daniel O'Regan was the Vulcan's player of the year, while Pita Godinet was the runner up and Sione Tongia was the rookie of the year.

2009 Junior Warriors

Siuatonga Likiliki was named in the 2009 Toyota Cup team of the year.

References

External links
Warriors official site
Warriors 2009 season rugby league project

New Zealand Warriors seasons
New Zealand Warriors season
War